Tamás Kulcsár (born 13 October 1982 in Debrecen) is a Hungarian football player who currently plays for Unione FC Budapest.

Club career

Debrecen
Kulcsár won the 2009–10 season of the Hungarian League with Debrecen despite his team lost to Kecskeméti TE in the last round. In 2010 Debrecen beat Zalaegerszegi TE in the Hungarian Cup final in the Puskás Ferenc Stadium by 3–2.

On 1 May 2012 Kulcsár won the Hungarian Cup with Debrecen by beating MTK Budapest on penalty shoot-out in the 2011–12 season. This was the fifth Hungarian Cup trophy for Debrecen.

On 12 May 2012 Kulcsár won the Hungarian League title with Debrecen after beating Pécs in the 28th round of the Hungarian League by 4–0 at the Oláh Gábor út Stadium which resulted the sixth Hungarian League title for the Hajdús.

Budaörsi SC announced on 19 June 2019, that Kulcsár had joined the club.

Honours
Debrecen
 Hungarian League (2): 2010, 2012
 Hungarian Cup (2): 2010, 2012

References

External links
 Profile at HLSZ
 
 

1982 births
Living people
Sportspeople from Debrecen
Hungarian footballers
Association football forwards
Létavértes SC players
Bőcs KSC footballers
Vác FC players
MTK Budapest FC players
Fehérvár FC players
Polonia Warsaw players
Debreceni VSC players
Vasas SC players
Budaörsi SC footballers
Nemzeti Bajnokság I players
Nemzeti Bajnokság II players
Hungarian expatriate footballers
Expatriate footballers in Poland
Hungarian expatriate sportspeople in Poland